Mesocerea distincta is a moth of the subfamily Arctiinae. It was described by Rothschild in 1911. It is found in Suriname.

References

 Natural History Museum Lepidoptera generic names catalog

Arctiinae
Moths described in 1911